Heather Katharine McRobie, also known professionally as Heather Allansdottir, is a British-Australian writer and academic.

Biography
She studied Modern History and Politics at Oxford University before going on to pursue further studies at the University of Sarajevo and McGill University in Montreal, Canada. Her move from Oxford to Montreal, aged 22, was allegedly inspired by her love of the Canadian singer-songwriter Leonard Cohen.

During her time as an undergraduate at Oxford University, she was a member of the comedy group The Oxford Imps and published creative writing in the May Anthologies collections in 2006 and 2007. Whilst at sixth form, in 2003 she organised protests against the Iraq war with her classmate Samir Jeraj, the New Statesman journalist.

She completed a doctorate in comparative constitutional law and human rights law, focused on the Egyptian constitutions since the 2011 Egyptian revolution, at the Oxford Law Faculty. She also worked for human rights NGOs in Jordan and Berlin.

She held post-doctoral positions in Tel Aviv and Moscow, before moving to Reykjavik to begin her current work on the Icelandic constitution.

McRobie's debut novel Psalm 119 (2008), published when the author was just 23, was awarded the Helene du Coudray Prize.

Her first non-fiction book, Literary Freedom: a Cultural Right to Literature, came out in 2013.

In a wide-ranging journalistic career, she has written for the Guardian, Al Jazeera, the New Statesman, the Times Literary Supplement, Salon, Foreign Policy, and The Globe and Mail, among many other publications. She was also an editor of the online outlet openDemocracy. Her non-academic writing has focused on politics, society, conflict and human rights across the UK, the Balkans, Middle East and former Soviet Union.

In an interview in 2018, she said she would like to continue writing both fiction and non-fiction.

In 2019, she was a semi-finalist for the Julia Child Fellowship at Le Cordon Bleu culinary school.

According to an interview in 2019, she can speak some Arabic, French, Russian, Mandarin and Icelandic but is only fluent in English. Elsewhere she has written satirically on her failure to become proficient in other languages.

As an academic, she currently researches and lectures on constitutional law, human rights law, and the philosophy of law, and is completing a book on comparative constitutional law. In 2021, she has mentioned her developing interest in space law.

In 2022, she joined The University of Law as an Academic Tutor.

References 

British women novelists
Living people
University of Sarajevo alumni
Alumni of the University of Oxford
Tel Aviv University alumni
21st-century Australian journalists
21st-century Australian novelists
21st-century British journalists
21st-century British novelists
21st-century Icelandic novelists
21st-century Australian philosophers
21st-century British philosophers
21st-century Icelandic philosophers
Bifröst University
McGill University alumni
Year of birth missing (living people)